The 1939 college football season concluded with the Aggies of The Agricultural and Mechanical College of Texas (Texas A&M) being named as the national champions by the voters in the Associated Press writers' poll. Led by consensus All-American fullback John Kimbrough, the Aggies went undefeated at 11–0 and outscored their opponents by a combined total of 212 to 31, with the defense allowing just 54 first downs and 763 yards all season, or 1.71 yards per play. On New Year's Day, Texas A&M defeated Tulane, 14–13 in the Sugar Bowl.

The Volunteers of the University of Tennessee were 10–0 and unscored upon in the regular season. For the second straight year, they finished second in the AP Poll (the final poll in this era came out before postseason bowl games). In the 1940 Rose Bowl, the Volunteers  faced the University of Southern California, who scored two touchdowns to defeat them, 14–0. One of that year’s seven contemporary math system selectors, Frank Dickinson, named 8–0–2 USC as his No. 1 choice. In 2004, USC decided to recognize this selection to claim a share of the 1939 title.

The 1939 Cornell Big Red finished 8–0 and was selected by one (Litkenhous System) of the six other contemporary math systems as its No. 1 team. The remaining five chose Texas A&M.

The first AP Poll of the season was taken after four weeks of play, starting with October 16.  Each writer listed his choice for the top ten teams, and points were tallied based on 10 for first place, 9 for second, etc., and the AP then ranked the twenty teams with the highest number of points.

Conference and program changes

Conferences
One new conference began football play in 1939:
California Collegiate Athletic Association – an active NCAA Division II conference that ended sponsorship of football in 1981

Programs

September
September 30 Defending champion TCU lost at UCLA, 6–2, on September 29, and finished 3–7–0. Tennessee won at N.C. State, 13–0.  Duke beat Davidson 26–6. Oklahoma and SMU played to a 7–7 tie. Notre Dame beat Purdue 3–0. Tulane edged Clemson 7–6. Fordham defeated Waynesburg 34–7 in the first-ever televised football game.

October
October 7 Tennessee beat Sewanee 40–0. Duke defeated Colgate 37–0. Notre Dame beat Georgia Tech 17–14. Tulane beat Auburn 12–0. Oklahoma won at Northwestern, 23–0.

October 14 Pittsburgh beat Duke 14–13.
Tennessee won at Chattanooga, 28–0.
Notre Dame edged SMU, 20–19.
Tulane beat Fordham 7–0.
Oklahoma beat Texas 24–12. The first AP Poll of the year listed Pittsburgh, Notre Dame, Oklahoma, Tulane, and Tennessee as the top five.

October 21 No. 1 Pittsburgh lost to cross-town rival Duquesne, 21–13.  In Cleveland, No. 2 Notre Dame defeated Navy, 14–7. No. 3 Oklahoma beat Kansas 27–7, but still fell to sixth in the next AP Poll. No. 4 Tulane and visiting No. 14 North Carolina played to a 14–14 tie. No. 5 Tennessee continued shutting out its opponents, beating No. 8 Alabama 21–0. No. 6 Michigan visited the Windy City and handed the University of Chicago an 85–0 defeat. No. 9 Texas A&M reached 5–0–0 with a 20–6 win over TCU. No. 10 Ohio State won at Minnesota, 23–20. The AP selected Tennessee, Notre Dame, Michigan, Texas A&M, and Ohio State as its top five.

October 28 
No. 1 Tennessee defeated Mercer, 17–0. In Pittsburgh, No. 2 Notre Dame edged Carnegie Tech, 7–6. No. 3 Michigan beat Yale 27–7. No. 4 Ohio State lost to No. 7 Cornell, 23–14. No. 5 Texas A&M beat Baylor 20–0. Nebraska defeated Kansas State in the second televised football game 25–9. In the next AP Poll, Tennessee remained at No. 1, while Michigan and Cornell moved ahead of Notre Dame (the Irish were 5-0-0, but each win was by a touchdown or less) and Texas A&M stayed at No. 5.

November
November 4 No. 1 Tennessee won at No. 18 LSU, 20–0.  No. 2 Michigan lost at unranked Illinois, 16–7.  No. 3 Cornell beat Columbia 13–7.  At Yankee Stadium, No. 4 Notre Dame beat Army 14–0.  No. 5 Texas A&M won at Arkansas 27–0.  No. 7 USC beat No. 11 Oregon State 19–7 in Portland. The next AP Poll was No. 1 Tennessee, No. 2 Texas A&M, No. 3 Notre Dame, No. 4 USC, and No. 5 Cornell.

November 11 No. 1 Tennessee shut out The Citadel, 34–0.
No. 2 Texas A&M defeated No. 13 SMU 6–2.  No. 3 Notre Dame, after several close calls in previous games, finally lost at unranked Iowa, 7–6.  No. 4 USC beat Stanford 20–12.  No. 5 Cornell narrowly beat Colgate 14–12.  No. 6 Oklahoma won at Kansas State 13–10. Tennessee and Texas A&M remained first and second in the next poll, followed by USC, Cornell, and Oklahoma.

November 18 No. 1 Tennessee extended its shutout streak, beating Vanderbilt 13–0.   Having outscored its opposition, 186–0, Tennessee had a record of 8–0–0, but fell to second in the poll that followed. Their replacement in the top spot was
No. 2 Texas A&M, which won at Rice 19–0.  No. 3 USC was idle.  No. 4 Cornell won at No. 20 Dartmouth, 35–6, to stay unbeaten, and they swapped spots with USC in the next poll.  No. 5 Oklahoma lost at No. 12 Missouri, 7–6.  No. 6 Tulane beat Columbia 25–0 to move into fifth place.

In the next poll, Texas A&M—which had gotten none of the first place votes the week before—was first, with 38 votes.  Tennessee, which had had 66 of the 85 No. 1 votes the week before, had 33 on the new round of ballots, and finished second.  There were 20 for Cornell, and 11 for USC.

November 25
No. 1 Texas A&M and 
No. 2 Tennessee were idle.  In Philadelphia, No. 3 Cornell closed its season with a 26–0 win over Penn, to finish unbeaten and untied at 8–0–0.  No. 4 USC won at No. 7 Notre Dame, 20–12.  No. 5 Tulane beat Sewanee 52–0.  In the next round of voting, Texas A&M and USC tied for first place, with 939 points apiece. Cornell led all teams with 34 first-place votes (A&M received 27 and USC 25), but their 909 overall points put them in third place. Tennessee fell to No. 4 and Tulane remained at No. 5.

On Thanksgiving Day, which fell on November 30 in 1939, No. 1 Texas A&M beat Texas 20–0 to complete a 10–0–0 season, and No. 4 Tennessee won at Kentucky, 19–0.  Two days later, 
December 2, No. 1 USC beat Washington 9–7.  No. 5 Tulane beat LSU 33–20. Texas A&M now stood alone in first place, followed by No. 2 Tennessee, No. 3 USC, No. 4 Cornell, and No. 5 Tulane.

December 9
No. 1 Texas A&M had finished its season and accepted a bid to the Sugar Bowl.  No. 2 Tennessee beat Auburn 7–0.  No. 3 USC and No. 9 UCLA played to a 0–0 tie. 
No. 4 Cornell and No. 5 Tulane had both completed their seasons, and the top five remained unchanged.

Conference standings

Major conference standings

Independents

Minor conferences

Minor conference standings

Rankings

Heisman Trophy voting
The Heisman Trophy is given to the year's most outstanding player

Bowl games

See also
1939 College Football All-America Team

References